Teen escort company, also called a youth transport firm, is a term used in the United States to describe a business that specializes in transporting teenagers from their homes to various facilities.

United States 
As a transport option, parents in the United States are able to hire teen escort companies to transport their children from their homes to residential treatment centers (RTCs). Private Residential Programs go by many names, and include private religious re-education facilities, teen residential programs, wilderness therapy programs, therapeutic boarding schools, boot camps, or behavior modification programs. 

In 2004, it was estimated that there were more than twenty teen escort companies operating in the United States. Parents may use this type of service when they believe their child needs treatment outside the home, but the parent or child is not willing to travel there. The service can cost $5,000 to $8,000 U.S. dollars.

Often, teens to be transported are picked up during the middle of the night to take advantage of their initial disorientation and to minimize confrontation and flight risk. Aggressive tactics, such as being punched, restrained with handcuffs, or hogtied with cable wires, are common.

The use of such services is controversial, because the services are subject to little or no government regulation and because they are associated with treatment services which are themselves controversial. For teenagers seized in the middle of the night by strangers, being abducted by a teen escort company may result in permanent trauma. Attempts to establish similar services in other countries have been quickly closed down by the authorities under their laws against child abuse, assault and torture.

References	 

Transportation in the United States
Human trafficking in the United States
Behavior modification
Euphemisms